Francisco Jesús Martín Morillas (born 1 February 1955) is a Spanish athlete. He competed in the men's high jump at the 1976 Summer Olympics.

References

External links
 

1955 births
Living people
Athletes (track and field) at the 1976 Summer Olympics
Spanish male high jumpers
Olympic athletes of Spain
Place of birth missing (living people)